Tiraspolul Nou (meaning "New Tiraspol" in Romanian;) is a town in Transnistria (de facto) in Moldova (de jure). In Transnistria, it is considered to be only a part of Tiraspol (located in the south-west of the country).

Notes

References

Cities and towns in Transnistria
Cities and towns in Moldova
Slobozia District